University for Business and Technology (UBT) is a private university located in Kosovo.

About 
UBT is an established and innovative institution of higher education in Kosovo which combines the advantages of internationally recognized universities. The university offers:
 Contemporary study programs based on international quality standards
 Distinguished academics and experts
 Partnerships with renowned universities and institutions which offer the possibility for study exchange and external professional experience
 Modern infrastructure and modern management (in accordance with ISO 9001)
 Direct links with the economy, academic and international research projects, and transfer of tech knowledge
 Highly motivated students and personnel
All of these components make UBT not only an important educational institution for the future of Kosovo, but a modern institution in Europe. With the visions of “Top Education for Top Students” and “Succeed with Quality”, UBT is continually looking towards the future and as a result, has become one of the most progressive and esteemed universities in the region.

Campus

Courses 
UBT provides a dynamic and international study environment for Bachelor and Master students through high-quality, problem based learning. The education offered at UBT include lectures in foreign languages by lecturers and scholars from abroad which creates an international study environment for both domestic and international students. With over 50 fields of study to choose from, students can select a field of specialization that fits with their aspirations and develop the concentrated knowledge necessary to become a successful entrant into the labor market.

The university offers both undergraduate and post-graduate courses. The following study programs are accredited at UBT:

 Management, Business and Economics (Bachelor's and Master's)
 Finance, Banking and Insurance
 Accounting, Audit and Taxation
 Marketing and Sales
 Management, Entrepreneurship and Innovation
 Logistics and Procurement Management
 International Business
 Computer Science and Engineering (Bachelor's and Master's)
 Software and Engineering Systems
 Database and Information Systems
 Network and Telecommunications
 Mechatronics and Robotics
 Design and Multimedia
 Mechatronics Management (Bachelor's and Master's)
 Electrotechnics
 Electronics
 Information Technology
 Industrial Production
 Industrial Design
 Information Systems (Bachelor's and Master's)
 Business Information Systems
 Geo Information Systems (GIS)
 Library Information Systems and Knowledge Management
 Statistics, Data Processing and Simulation
 Information Security and Privacy
 Architecture and Spatial Planning (Bachelor's and Master's)
 Architecture
 Design
 Spatial Planning
 Energy and Environment
 Building and Infrastructure Engineering (Bachelor's)
 Infrastructure
 Environment
 Management
 Construction
 Political Science and Diplomacy (Bachelor's)
 International Relations and Diplomacy
 European Integration
 Public Administration
 Law (Bachelor's and Master's)
 Civil Law
 Criminal Law
 International Law
 International and European Business Law
 Media and Communication (Bachelor's)
 Journalism
 Communication
 Media Management
 Public Relations
 Online Journalism
 Camera and Photography
 Energy Engineering (Bachelor's and Professional Diploma)
 Energy Efficiency Engineering (only accredited institution in Kosovo)
 Energy Economy
 Sustainable Design
 Electric Generation and Renewable Energy
 Energy Management
 Biomass Energy and Environment
 Nursing (Bachelor's)
 General Emergency Nursing
 Internal Medicine Nursing
 Surgical Nursing
 Community and Family Nursing
 Mental Health Nursing
 Oncology Nursing
 Obstetrical Nursing
 Pediatric Nursing
 Integrated Design (Bachelor's)
 Graphic and Communication Design
 Fashion and Textile Design
 Industrial Product Design
 Building and Furniture Design
 Food Science and Technology (Bachelor's)
 Food Technology
 Nutrition
 Food Quality and Safety Management
 Public Policy and Management (Master's)

Notes

References

External links 
 

Business and Technology
Buildings and structures in Pristina
Education in Pristina